Danny Mansoni Ngombo (born 25 October 1963) is a retired Congolese football defender. He was a squad member at the 1988, 1992 and 1994 Africa Cup of Nations.

References

1963 births
Living people
Democratic Republic of the Congo footballers
Democratic Republic of the Congo international footballers
1988 African Cup of Nations players
1992 African Cup of Nations players
1994 African Cup of Nations players
K. Beerschot V.A.C. players
Beerschot A.C. players
R.F.C. Seraing (1904) players
Wuppertaler SV players
R. Charleroi S.C. players
C.S. Visé players
Association football defenders
Democratic Republic of the Congo expatriate footballers
Expatriate footballers in Belgium
Democratic Republic of the Congo expatriate sportspeople in Belgium
Belgian Pro League players
Expatriate footballers in Germany
Democratic Republic of the Congo expatriate sportspeople in Germany
21st-century Democratic Republic of the Congo people